Vaigeliškės is a village in Vilnius district municipality, Lithuania. According to the 2011 census, it had population of 37.

Vilnius District Municipality
Villages in Vilnius County